Rumex arifolius, common name maiden sorrel  or mountain dock, is a leafy perennial herb in the family Polygonaceae.

Description
This plant has fleshy large leaves with entire blade margins. The inconspicuous white flowers and seeds are carried on long clusters at the top of a stalk arising from the axil of leaves. The flowers are dioecious and anemophilous. They bloom from May to June.

Taxonomy
Rumex arifolius was first described by Carl Christian Gmelin in 1806.

Distribution
Maiden sorrel is native to southern Europe, and parts of northern temperate Asia.

Habitat

References

External links
 
 The Linnean Collections

hispanicus
Flora of Europe
Flora of temperate Asia
Plants described in 1806